was a village located in Higashikanbara District, Niigata, Japan.

As of 2003, the village had an estimated population of 4,116 and a density of 16.47 persons per km². The total area was 249.87 km².

On April 1, 2005, Mikawa, along with the towns of Kanose and Tsugawa, and the village of Kamikawa (all from Higashikanbara District) were merged to create the town of Aga.

Dissolved municipalities of Niigata Prefecture
Aga, Niigata